Carwow, stylised as carwow, is an online marketplace for buying and selling new and used cars. It uses the reverse marketplace model to remove the need for customers to negotiate with dealers when buying or selling their cars. When buying a new car, users choose the car they would like to buy, along with the various specifications and features, and then receive offers direct from dealers. When selling a car, users upload some basic details about their car (such as the registration number, mileage and some photos) and then different car dealers are invited to bid to buy the car directly from them. It also provides information to prospective purchasers and gives feedback on rogue dealers. The company also has a YouTube page, run by motor journalist and carwow's Chief Content Officer Mat Watson, where different cars are reviewed. 

The company has partnered with the RAC as part of RAC Cars' ‘search, buy, sell’ website. 

Carwow was founded by James Hind and launched in May 2013. James Hind, when operating Carbuzz, came across the concept from a company which used the reverse tendering concept called My Best Deal. My Best Deal was the concept of David Paterson, formerly in the motor industry. David Paterson operated at a management level within the motor industry, providing finance and insurance services to clients.
Carwow’s investors include venture firms Balderton Capital, Episode 1 Ventures, Samos Investments and Accel Partners. The company had sold over 20,000 cars valued at £550m by January 2016.

History
The company originally launched in 2010 as car research site carbuzz. It offered aggregated expert reviews, user reviews, statistics, videos and images to help consumers looking to purchase a new car find the best vehicle for their taste, budget and requirements. 

In May 2013 it re-launched as a car buying platform. The company then raised £1.3m in venture capital finance from Balderton Capital, Episode 1 Ventures and Samos Investments, as well as several angel investors including Alex Chesterman and Simon Murdoch, in February 2014 to fund growth.

In 2014, its investors provided a further £4.6m of capital so the company could 'expand the team further, roll out above-the-line advertising campaigns and start exploring new markets'.

In August 2015, following a complaint from a competitor, the Advertising Standards Authority found that the competitor "had been providing the same service since 2003" and therefore the ASA "told carwow not to claim that they were the first or only company to offer the advertised service."

In January 2016, carwow raised a further £12.5m in a Series B funding round led by Accel Partners.

A £6m TV advertising campaign for carwow was launched in December 2015, voiced by actor Michael Gambon.

In June 2021 carwow acquired Wizzle a consumer to business car buying platform founded by entrepreneur Sebastien Duval. Wizzle was rebranded Sell Your Car and allowed carwow to significantly grow the business by entering the used car market.

As of June 2021, carwow has multiple YouTube channels in various different languages, presented by Mat Watson (or Dean Malay for the German channel), with a combined total of 5.72 million subscribers and over 1.88 billion views in the English main channel.

In 2022, Volvo Cars acquired a minority stake in the company.

In November 2022, carwow cut close to a fifth of total staff due to economic concerns. Around 70 staff members were released across the UK, Spain and Germany.

References

External links
 Company home page
 CNBC interview of carwow CEO and founder James Hind

Online automotive companies
Retail companies established in 2013
Internet properties established in 2013
Online marketplaces of the United Kingdom